Parliamentary elections were held in Ecuador on 4 June 1986. Only the 59 district members of the House of Representatives were elected. The Democratic Left emerged as the largest party, winning 14 of the 59 seats.

Results

References

Elections in Ecuador
1986 in Ecuador
Ecuador